Prince or King of Qi may refer to:

Zhou dynasty

King of Qi state
King Wei of Qi, ruled 356  320 BC
King Xuan of Qi, ruled 319  301 BC
King Min of Qi, ruled 300  283 BC

Han dynasty
Han Xin, (203 BC – 202 BC) a military commander served under Liu Bang. 
Liu Fei, (202 BC – 189 BC), eldest son of Emperor Gaozu of Han.
Liu Xiang, (189 BC –179 BC) a key figure during the Lü Clan Disturbance.

Wei and Jin dynasties
Cao Fang, demoted to Prince of Qi after losing Emperor title.
Sima You, second son of Sima Zhao.
Sima Jiong, one of the princes in War of the Eight Princes.

Southern and Northern Dynasties
Emperor Wenxuan of Northern Qi, held the title Prince of Qi before becoming Emperor.
Yuwen Xian, fifth son of Yuwen Tai.
Emperor Gao of Southern Qi, held the title Prince of Qi before becoming Emperor.

Sui dynasty
Yang Jian (Sui prince), second son of Emperor Yang of Sui.

Tang dynasty
Li Yuanji, youngest son of Li Yuan that died during the Incident at Xuanwu Gate.
Li Yu, fifth son of Emperor Taizong of Tang.

Five Dynasties and Ten Kingdoms Period
Emperor Yuanzong of Southern Tang, held the title Prince of Qi before becoming Emperor.
Shi Chonggui, held the title Prince of Qi before becoming Emperor.
Han Tejang, a chancellor for the Liao dynasty.

Song dynasty
Zhao Tingmei, fourth brother of Emperor Taizu of Song.

Yuan dynasty
 Shiremun, son of Ogedei khan. Death at 1258.
 Babusha (Qi wang). descent of Khasar, April 5 1307 seal.
 Yulong temur, son of Babusha descent of Khasar, 1316-1326.
 Yuelutemur, son of Yulong temur. He had inherited Qi wang's seal. From to August 25 1326 between February 5 1329.   
Köke Temür, Bayad Mongol general that served under Ukhaantu Khan. He was son of Sayinchi Dahu, lord of Bayad Mongols.

Ming dynasty
Zhu Pu, seventh son of Hongwu Emperor.

See also
Qi (Shandong)
Qiwang (disambiguation)

Han dynasty